Prunus turcomanica, the Turkmen almond, is a putative species of wild almond native to Iran, Turkmenistan and possibly eastern Turkey. A genetic and morphological study has shown that it is conspecific with Prunus spinosissima.

References

turcomanica
Flora of Iran
Flora of Turkmenistan
Plants described in 1960